The Di Rudinì III government of Italy held office from 15 July 1896 until 14 December 1897, a total of 521 days, or 1 year, 5 months and 3 days.

Government parties
The government was composed by the following parties:

The cabinet was externally supported by the Historical Left.

Composition

References

Italian governments
1896 establishments in Italy